The Arcadia 30, or just Arcadia, is a French sailboat that was designed by Tony Castro as a cruiser and first built in 1983.

The boat is a development of the Sun Fast 1/2 Ton International Offshore Rule Half Ton class racer and was later developed into the 1987 Sun Dream 28 and Sun Way 28.

Production
The design was built by Jeanneau in France, from 1983 until 1986, with 600 boats completed.

Design
The Arcadia 30 is a recreational keelboat, built predominantly of polyester fiberglass, with wood trim. The hull is solid fiberglass and the deck is balsa-cored fiberglass. It has a masthead sloop rig, with a deck-stepped mast, two sets of unswept spreaders and aluminum spars with 1X19 stainless steel wire rigging. The hull has a raked stem, a reverse transom, a skeg-mounted rudder controlled by a tiller with an extension and a fixed fin keel or optional stub keel and retractable centerboard. The fin keel version displaces  and carries  of cast iron ballast, while the centerboard version displaces  and carries  of ballast, comprising cast iron exterior ballast and a steel centerboard.

The design has sleeping accommodation for six people, with a double "V"-berth in the bow cabin, an "U"-shaped settee in the main cabin and an aft cabin with a double berth on the port side. The galley is located on the port side just forward of the companionway ladder. The galley is "L"-shaped and is equipped with a two-burner stove, a  ice box and a sink. A navigation station is opposite the galley, on the starboard side. The head is located just aft of the navigation station on the starboard side.

Operational history
In a 2000 review in Practical Sailor, Darrell Nicholson wrote, "overall the Jeanneau Arcadia surprised us. We were expecting a boat comparable in quality to mid-line American production boats; we found the Jeanneau to be somewhat better in construction and in many details. Being fond of tradition, we have a problem with the style of most of the Jeanneaus, including the Arcadia, but ultimately style is a tenuous criticism of a boat, unless it is truly ugly."

See also
List of sailing boat types

References

External links

Keelboats
1980s sailboat type designs
Sailing yachts
Sailboat type designs by Tony Castro
Sailboat types built by Jeanneau